Asta Anthony Philpot is an American (born Miami, Florida, 1982) man who was the protagonist of a 2007 BBC One documentary film titled For one night only. He is affected with arthrogryposis, which impairs, since his birth, his physical ability of movement. He advocates the right to an active sexual life for people with disabilities, even if this means paying for sex.

After hearing of a legal brothel with access for wheelchair during a vacation in Spain in 2006, he visited the place and lost his virginity. He found this experience very interesting and decided, therefore, to organize a trip with other people sharing his extreme difficulties in finding a romantic or sexual relationship as a consequence of physical disabilities, advertising his intentions through dedicated Internet forums.

Although finding initial resistance to the idea, two other young men, affected with different medical conditions (one legally blind and the other paralysed in a motorcycle accident) accepted to join the vacation with the purpose to visit the Spanish night club and have the opportunity of a sexual encounter. A BBC documentary team headed by Producer/Director Jane Beckwith filmed it: the documentary opened some controversies about the opportunity to legalize prostitution in UK, as a means of giving sexual experiences to physically disabled people, who often lack enough social opportunities to build a love relationship, although having a normal social potentiality and normal feelings and sexual needs.

His views contributed to the acclaimed Belgian 2011 film Come as You Are (original title Hasta La Vista), written by Mariano Vanhoof and directed by Geoffrey Enthoven.

See also 
 Nina de Vries is a Dutch sex worker who offers erotic massages to mentally disabled men and women in Germany.
  Mission Paradis sorti en 2020 sur 3 jeunes handicapés en road trip vers Montréal

External links 
Asta Philpot official website
BBC News article regarding his story and the documentary.
 BBC One page of the episode of the documentary series One Life dedicated to the story of Asta Philpot (episode 3, serie 9).
 Interview with Asta Philpot on the Young Turks liberal talk radio show, May 2010 on YouTube.

1982 births
American disability rights activists
Living people
People with arthrogryposis
People from Miami